Jigri Dost is a 1969 Hindi-language comedy film, produced by Sunderlal Nahata and Dhoondy under the Vijaya Lakhshmi Pictures banner and directed by Ravikant Nagaich. It stars Jeetendra, Mumtaz and Poonam Sinha  and music composed by Laxmikant–Pyarelal. The heroine Komal in the movie is actually Poonam Sinha, Shatrughan Sinha's wife. The film is a remake of 1966 Kannada movie Emme Thammanna, which had earlier been remade in Telugu in 1968 as Govula Gopanna and which later went on to be remade in Tamil in 1970 as Maattukara Velan.

Plot
Gopi is an innocent village guy whose livelihood is rearing cattle and looks God in them. Neelkanth chairman of the municipality is crooked and cruel, performs many atrocities in the town also involved in anti-social and illegal activities. He has an arrogant daughter Komal and a good-nurtured son Kasthuri. Kasthuri always teases and revolts against his father for his evil deeds. Once Gopi's cows obstruct Komal's way, she beats the cattle when Gopi becomes furious and beats her in turn. But becomes frightened when he learns that Komal is chairman's daughter. Neelkanth sends his men to kill Gopi when Kasthuri rescues him and changes his attire as a college student. Meanwhile, Advocate Narayan Das an honest person who always supports the justice, backs the piety and gives a tough fight to Neelkanth. He leads a happy family life with his ideal wife Annapurna and a daughter Shobha. Narayan Das fixes his daughter marriage with his childhood friend Sripathi's son Anand who looks like Gopi. On the advice of Kasturi Gopi reaches Narayan Das's house, they mistake him as Anand and highly honors him. Here Gopi & Shobha fall in love. Eventually, Anand arrives to apprentice Narasimha, he was caught by goons of Neelkanth they take him to Neelkanth's house and beats him. However, Sekhar escapes, enters Narayan Das's house where he is surprised to see Gopi, explains Sekhar about his problem and he understands the fact. Knowing that Gopi is in love with Shobha he stops and asks him to stay along with him. Now they play a confuse drama without revealing their identity. Meanwhile, Sekhar meets Komal, she again teases him mistaking him as Gopi but afterward feels sorry when both of them fall in love. On the other hand, Kasthuri loves their maidservant. Unfortunately, once Shobha witnesses Anand & Komal, misunderstands Gopi when Anand turn up, affirms the entire story. Hearing it, Narayan Das throws Gopi out and decides to make Shobha's marriage with Anand. But Anand refuses it and says he is going to marry Komal. Then Narayan Das declares Neelkanth as his father's murderer who projected it as a suicide. Listening to it Anand breakdowns and he also learns that his father gathered evidence against Neelkanth in a diary and secured it in a secret place. In that anger, Anand burst out on Neelkanth, knowing that Anand is Sripati's son he captivates him and blackmails Narayan Das for the diary. Immediately, Narayan Das rushes to Neelkanth's house when Neelkanth is about to kill Narayan Das Gopi comes to his protection where he plays a drama as if he has murdered Narayan Das. At this moment, everyone understands Gopi's virtue, simultaneously, Anand is shifted to Neelkanth's den. Ultimately, Gopi breaks out diary's secret, finds the route map to Neelkanth's den, sees the end of him and protects Anand. Finally, the movie ends on a happy note with the marriages of Gopi & Shobha and Anand & Komal.

Cast
Jeetendra as Gopi and Advocate Anand (dual role)
Mumtaz as Shobha N. Das
Poonam Sinha as Komal
Agha as Advocate Narayan Das
K. N. Singh as Chairman Neelkanth 
Jagdeep as Kasturi 
Prem Kumar as Jagawar
Nirupa Roy as Annapurna N. Das
Aruna Irani as Neelkanth's maidservant

Soundtrack

References

External links 
 

1969 films
1960s Hindi-language films
Films scored by Laxmikant–Pyarelal
Hindi remakes of Kannada films
Films directed by Ravikant Nagaich